Leonard Owusu (born June 3, 1997) is a Ghanaian professional footballer who plays for Vancouver Whitecaps FC as a midfielder.

Career

Dreams
Owusu signed his first professional contract for Dreams in 2017. Owusu led his team to promotion to the Ghana Premier League, and was subsequently made captain for the 2018 season.

Ashdod
On July 31, 2018, Owusu joined Ashdod of the Israeli Premier League on a season-long loan, with an option to make the transfer permanent on a three-year contract. The option was exercised the following season.

Vancouver Whitecaps FC
On January 21, 2020, it was announced that Owusu would be joining Vancouver Whitecaps FC of Major League Soccer on a contract through 2022 with options for 2023.

References

Living people
1997 births
Association football midfielders
Footballers from Accra
Ghanaian footballers
Ghana Premier League players
Ghanaian expatriate footballers
F.C. Ashdod players
Ghanaian expatriate sportspeople in Israel
Expatriate footballers in Israel
Israeli Premier League players
Major League Soccer players
Vancouver Whitecaps FC players
Expatriate soccer players in Canada
Ghanaian expatriate sportspeople in Canada